Renato Ribeiro Calixto (born October 4, 1988, in Cardoso, São Paulo), most commonly known as Renatinho,  is a Brazilian  footballer who plays as a winger.

Club career

Coritiba

Renatinho came up through the Coritiba youth system. He was called up to the senior side for the 2008 Campeonato Paranaense where he scored a wonderful free kick goal. He was then loaned out to Londrina to gain experience.

Londrina

In October 2008, Renatinho was loaned to Londrina to participate in the 2008 Copa Parana. He helped the team to win the title. He scored the lone goal in the final, as well as in the penalties.

Return to Coritiba

Renatinho returned to Coritiba for the 2009 Campeonato Paranaense, where he made his mark as a starter, scoring twice in 17 games. He also started 6 times in the Copa do Brasil, scoring once. He had a bit of trouble establishing himself in the early stages of the Campeonato Brasileiro, but he eventually broke through and is now a regular. He scored his first goal in his very first game, 5 minutes into a 4-2 loss against Santo André on 16 May 2009. He has since added to the tally against São Paulo on 7 October 2009.

He has also featured in both of Coritiba's Copa Sudamericana matches in 2009, scoring once.

Kawasaki Frontale

On 17 December 2011, Renatinho signed with Japanese side Kawasaki Frontale on a loan deal lasting until the end of the 2012 season.

China
On 15 July 2015, Renatinho transferred to Chinese Super League side Guangzhou R&F.
In China he is known as 雷纳迪尼奥. On 28 February 2019, Renatinho was loaned to fellow first-tier club Tianjin Tianhai for the 2019 season. He returned to Guangzhou for the 2020 season and made his 100th appearance for the club in September 2020.

Playing style
Renatinho is a player who uses his low centre of gravity to control the ball on various runs. He has developed a reputation for the spectacular. For a player of his size and position, he is also quite responsible defensively. He likes to play behind the striker or on the wings.

Career statistics
.

Honours

Club
Coritiba
 Campeonato Paranaense: 2008

Londrina
 Copa Paraná: 2008

References

External links 
 

 https://web.archive.org/web/20091012085115/http://www.coritiba.com.br/site/index.php?pag=elenco_int&j_cod=92 Coritiba player page (pt)

1988 births
Living people
Brazilian footballers
Coritiba Foot Ball Club players
Londrina Esporte Clube players
Atlético Clube Goianiense players
Associação Atlética Ponte Preta players
Brazilian expatriate footballers
J1 League players
Kawasaki Frontale players
Expatriate footballers in Japan
Chinese Super League players
Guangzhou City F.C. players
Tianjin Tianhai F.C. players
Expatriate footballers in China
Brazilian expatriate sportspeople in China
Association football midfielders